Dove Lake is a corrie lake near Cradle Mountain in the central highlands region of Tasmania, Australia. It lies in the Cradle Mountain-Lake St Clair National Park. The lake is a very popular visitor attraction and is encircled by well maintained walking paths which also lead up onto Cradle Mountain.  It was named by prominent local Gustav Weindorfer after an official of the Van Diemen's Land Company.

Like several other lakes in the region, Lake Dove was formed by glaciation. The habitat is unique and includes the Tasmanian deciduous beech (Nothofagus gunnii), tussock grasses, snow gums and pencil pines. Among animals wandering the shores of the lake are numerous wombats, echidnas, pademelons and tiger snakes.

See also

 List of lakes in Tasmania
List of reservoirs and dams in Tasmania
List of glacial lakes in Australia

References

External links

Lakes of Tasmania
Central Highlands (Tasmania)
Glacial lakes of Australia